Ogazón is a Spanish surname. Notable people with the surname include:
Alba Herrera y Ogazón (1885–1931), Mexican pianist
Arturo Barea Ogazon (1897–1957), Spanish journalist, broadcaster and writer
Bernardo Doroteo Reyes Ogazón (1850–1913), Mexican general and politician
Ignacio Luis Vallarta Ogazón (1830–1893), Mexican jurist, former governor of Jalisco
Pedro Ogazón (1821–1890), Mexican politician, former governor of Jalisco

Spanish-language surnames